Pre-Indo-European means "preceding Indo-European languages".

Pre-Indo-European may refer to:
 Pre-Indo-European languages, several (not necessarily related) ancient languages in prehistoric Europe and South Asia before the arrival of Indo-European languages
 Pre-Proto-Indo-European, theoretical reconstruction of language earlier than the Proto-Indo-European language
 Old Europe (archaeology), a Neolithic culture in southeastern Europe before the arrival of speakers of Indo-European languages

See also
Pre-Germanic (disambiguation)
Indo-European (disambiguation)
Neolithic Europe, the period when Neolithic technology was present in Europe, roughly 7000 BCE to 1700 BCE
Proto-Indo-European Urheimat hypotheses, proposed homeland of the common ancestor of Indo-European languages
Pre-Greek substrate, unknown language(s) spoken in prehistoric Greece before the Proto-Greek language
Pre-Celtic, prehistory of Central and Western Europe before the expansion of the Celts
Vasconic substratum theory, proposal that several Western European languages contain remnants of an old language family of Vasconic languages